Baselice is a comune (municipality) in the Province of Benevento in the Italian region Campania, located about 90 km northeast of Naples and about 35 km northeast of Benevento.

Baselice borders the following municipalities: Castelvetere in Val Fortore, Colle Sannita, Foiano di Val Fortore, San Bartolomeo in Galdo, San Marco dei Cavoti.

References

Cities and towns in Campania